At the 1992 Winter Olympics, fifteen Nordic skiing events were contested – ten cross-country skiing events, three ski jumping events, and two Nordic combined events.

1992 Winter Olympics
1992 Winter Olympics events